John Clyde Copeland (March 27, 1937 – July 3, 1997) was an American Texas blues guitarist and singer. In 1983, he was named Blues Entertainer of the Year by the Blues Foundation. He is the father of blues singer Shemekia Copeland.

In 2017, Copeland was posthumously inducted into the Blues Hall of Fame.

Career
Copeland was born in Haynesville, Louisiana. Influenced by T-Bone Walker, he formed the Dukes of Rhythm in Houston, Texas, and made his recording debut in 1956, signing with Duke Records the following year. Although his early records met with little commercial success, he became a popular touring act over the next two decades.

His early recording career embraced blues, soul and rock and roll. He recorded singles for Mercury, Golden Eagle and All Boy, amongst others. His first single was "Rock 'n' Roll Lily", and he later cut successes such as "Down on Bending Knees" and "Please Let Me Know". For the most part, his singles featured Copeland as a vocalist more than a guitar player.

Driven by disco to rethink his future, he moved to New York City in 1976, and played extensively in Eastern cities. In New York he met a young record producer named Dan Doyle who was instrumental in getting Copeland signed with Rounder Records. Doyle produced Copeland's initial Rounder releases including Copeland Special for which he won a W. C. Handy Award in 1981, and  Bringin' It All Back Home (1985). Copeland also recorded with Albert Collins and Robert Cray, winning a Grammy in 1987 for Best Traditional Blues Album, for the album Showdown!.

Touring widely, Copeland appeared at the 1983 Long Beach Blues Festival and the 1988 San Francisco Blues Festival. Copeland also played at the 1985 Montreux Jazz Festival, as a guest with Stevie Ray Vaughan and his band Double Trouble. Vaughan and Copeland performed the Bob Geddins song "Tin Pan Alley" together on Vaughan's compilation album Blues at Sunrise. He also played on the first edition of BRBF (Blues Peer Festival) later that year.

His later years were dogged by ill health due to a congenital heart defect. He died, aged 60, in Columbia-Presbyterian Medical Center, in New York City, from complications of heart surgery for a heart transplanted six months earlier.

Copeland was a resident of Teaneck, New Jersey. His daughter, Shemekia Copeland, established a successful career as a singer. He was also survived by his wife, son and two daughters.

In 2017, Copeland was posthumously inducted in to the Blues Hall of Fame.

Selected recordings
1981: Copeland Special (Rounder)
1984: Texas Twister (Rounder)
1985: Bringin' It All Back Home (Rounder)
1989: Blues Power (P-Vine Records)
1989: Boom Boom (Rounder)
1991: When the Rain Starts Fallin''' (Rounder)
1994: Catch Up with the Blues (Verve)
1995: Jungle Swing (Verve Records)
1996: Texas Party1998: The Crazy Cajun Recordings (Edsel Records)
1999: Honky Tonkin'''

See also
List of blues musicians
List of electric blues musicians
List of Texas blues musicians
List of people from Teaneck, New Jersey

References

External links
 Official memorial website
More information
[ Copeland biography] at Allmusic website

1937 births
1997 deaths
African-American guitarists
American blues guitarists
American male guitarists
American blues singers
Singers from New York City
People from Haynesville, Louisiana
People from Teaneck, New Jersey
Kent Records artists
Grammy Award winners
Texas blues musicians
Singers from Louisiana
20th-century American guitarists
Guitarists from Louisiana
Guitarists from Texas
Guitarists from New York City
Rounder Records artists
P-Vine Records artists
American funk musicians
American dance musicians
Wand Records artists
20th-century African-American male singers